1250 Poydras Plaza (also known as the Eni Building and formerly the Mobil Building), is a high-rise international-style office building located at 1250 Poydras Street in the Central Business District of New Orleans, Louisiana.

In June 2010, the Unified Command moved its headquarters from the Dutch Royal Shell Conference Center in Robert, Louisiana, to the building to deal with the Deepwater Horizon oil spill.

See also
 List of tallest buildings in New Orleans

References

Skyscraper office buildings in New Orleans
Office buildings completed in 1979
ExxonMobil buildings and structures